Mette Towley is an American dancer and actress.

Early life and education
Towley was born in Owatonna, Minnesota, and raised in Severn, Maryland and Alexandria, Minnesota.  Towley has a white father and a black mother, and self-identifies  as mixed race.  Her father is an engineer, and her mother is an accountant.
She was introduced to dance at age five at Baltimore School for the Arts student recitals.
She graduated from Jefferson Senior High School of Alexandria, MN in 2009 and earned a  degree in dance from the College of Liberal Arts at the University of Minnesota.

Career

In 2019, Towley performed in  Hustlers, and in Cats in the role of Cassandra. Her breakthrough role  was as the dancer in the music video for Lemon by N.E.R.D. and Rihanna.
Towley has appeared on The Ellen DeGeneres Show. She’s also performed in the 2020 superhero movie The Old Guard in the minor role of Jordan, Nile’s friend in the Marines. She has also released a song in 2021 called 'Petrified' as well as a music video for it.

Personal life
Towley currently lives in Los Angeles.

References

External links

Living people
People from Minnesota
University of Minnesota College of Liberal Arts alumni
21st-century American actresses
21st-century American singers
21st-century American women singers
American dancers
Year of birth missing (living people)